Maisy Barker is a footballer who plays as a defender for West Ham United in the FA Women's Super League.

Club career 
Barker made her senior debut for West Ham in the 2020/21 WSL campaign, in a 4–0 defeat against Manchester City Women. Barker was subbed on in the 71st minute, replacing Lois Joel. Barkers second, and most recent appearance came against Manchester United Women in a 2–0 defeat away from home. Barker entered the field in the 89th minute, replacing Redish Kvamme.

Barker has also made two appearances in the FA Women's Continental Tyres League Cup against Charlton Athletic Women and Chelsea Women, in a 4–0 victory  and a 6–0 defeat  respectively.

International career 
Barker represented England at an under-17 level, between the years 2018 and 2019.

References 

English women's footballers
West Ham United F.C. Women players
2002 births
Living people
Women's association football defenders
England women's youth international footballers